Of Dirt and Grace: Live from the Land is the thirteenth live album from Australian contemporary worship music band Hillsong United, a worship band from Hillsong Church. The album was released on 15 July 2016, under Hillsong Music, Sparrow Records and Capitol Christian Music Group. Touted as a "visual album", the record features new arrangements of their fourth studio album, Empires (2015), which were performed live and filmed around various locations in Israel. The album was also released in DVD on 29 July 2016. "Prince of Peace" was released as the album's lead single in July 2016.

Background
Hillsong United previously took inspiration from the Sermon on the Mount and the Beatitudes for their fourth studio album, Empires (2015). The group wanted to film live performances of the song around places in Israel where the aforementioned events took place, as well as other Biblically historical locations. The album features new arrangements of the songs from Empires, as well as two tracks from Zion (2013), "Scandal of Grace" and "Oceans (Where Feet May Fail)", and the Hillsong Worship song "I Surrender" from Cornerstone (2012). While Empires featured "EDM pulses" throughout the album, Of Dirt and Grace features the tracks "decelerated into slow and pensive ballads." Of Dirt and Grace: Live from the Land differs from previous Hillsong United albums, due to the visual concept, the abundance of ballads, as well as the prominence of vocalist Taya Smith, who sings in half the album. Several members of the band wrote blog posts on Hillsong's website narrating their experiences while recording and filming the album.

Promotion
On 21 June 2016, Hillsong United performed "Say the Word" on The Morning Show. On 1 July 2016, the live performance of "Prince of Peace" was released as an instant-grat single for those who pre-ordered the album, while its music video was released in Hillsong United's official website. The music video of the live performance of "Say the Word" was released on 14 July 2016.

Reception

Giving Of Dirt and Grace four out of five stars, Lucas Munachen of Jesus Freak Hideout opined that the "slow build" of most of the songs "creates an ethereal atmosphere that sets its sight above", and called the usage of the filmed performances "an original concept that enhances the beauty of these songs even further." Timothy Yap of Hallels praised the visual album concept, stating, "While many worship albums serve to engage the ears, Of Dirt and Grace makes Jesus palatable through all our five senses. Ryan Loche of The Church Collective felt the new versions of the songs from Empires "[give] great ways to bring some of the synth-heavy songs from the past album to a more acoustic [worship] team." Phil Schneider of ChurchMag called the album "a beautiful album, a passionate and creative performance," adding, "As a live album, it’s sonically perfect. As a concept album, it’s intellectually inspiring. As a worship album, it’s both spiritually uplifting and challenging."

Awards and accolades
On 9 August 2017, it was announced that Of Dirt and Grace would be nominated for a GMA Dove Award in the Long Form Video of the Year category at the 48th Annual GMA Dove Awards.

On 17 October 2017, Of Dirt and Grace won the GMA Dove Award for Long Form Video of the Year with director Joel Houston and David Rubie alongside producer Jason Strong being the receipts at a ceremony at Allen Arena in Nashville, Tennessee.

Track listing

Charts
In Australia, Of Dirt and Grace: Live from the Land debuted at number twelve on the ARIA Albums Chart, marking it as the twenty-ninth Top 50 chart entry for a Hillsong album. The following week, the album reached a new peak at number eight, thus becoming the twenty-first top 10 entry for a Hillsong album.

Release history

References

Hillsong Music live albums
Sparrow Records live albums
2016 live albums